The Hostage is a 1956 British crime film directed by Harold Huth and starring Ron Randell, Mary Parker and John Bailey.

Plot
A group of South American revolutionaries plan to kidnap the daughter of their President in London, England.

Production
It was made at New Elstree Studios. The film's sets were designed by the art director Harry White.

Cast
Ron Randell as Bill Trailer 
Mary Parker as Rosa Gonzuelo 
John Bailey as Dr Main
Carl Jaffe as Dr Pablo Gonzuelo
Anne Blake as Mrs Steen
Cyril Luckham as Hugh Ferguson
Margaret Diamond as Madame Gonzuelo
Victor Brooks as Inspector Clifford
James Liggat	as Sergeant Reid
Robert Marsden as Benda
John Rutland as Jim Barnes
Everley Gregg as Mrs Barnes
John Phillips as Workman

References

Bibliography
Chibnall, Steve & McFarlane, Brian. The British 'B' Film. Palgrave MacMillan, 2009.

External links

1956 films
British crime thriller films
1950s crime thriller films
Films directed by Harold Huth
Films set in London
Films shot at New Elstree Studios
1950s English-language films
1950s British films
British black-and-white films